John E. Coffee (December 3, 1782 – September 25, 1836) was a military leader and a Congressman for the state of Georgia.

Early life
John E. Coffee was born in Prince Edward County, Virginia in 1782.  He was a grandson of Peter Coffee, Sr. (1716 – November 1771) and Susannah Mathews (1701–1796).  He is sometimes confused by researchers with his first cousin John Coffee, who served as a general in the Tennessee militia.

John E. Coffee was 18 when he moved with his family to Hancock County, Georgia, in 1800. His parents developed a cotton plantation near Powelton, based on the labor of enslaved African Americans.

In 1807, the younger Coffee settled in Telfair County, Georgia, where he developed his own plantation.

Military career
As a general in the Georgia state militia, Coffee supervised construction in the 1820s of a supply road through the state of Georgia. It was called "Coffee Road" and enabled the transportation of munitions to the Florida Territory to fight the Indians during the Creek Wars. It is now called the "Old Coffee Road".

Political career

John Coffee served as a member of the Georgia Senate from 1819 to 1827.  He was elected as a Jacksonian Democrat to the Twenty-third and Twenty-fourth U.S. Congresses and served from March 4, 1833, until his death on September 25, 1836. He was re-elected to the Twenty-fifth United States Congress on October 3, 1836, after his death, the news of his death not having been received.

Coffee died on his plantation near Jacksonville, Georgia, on September 25, 1836, and was buried there.  In 1921, his remains were reinterred in McRae Cemetery, McRae, Georgia.

Legacy and honors
In addition to Old Coffee Road, Coffee County, Georgia, and General Coffee State Park were named in honor of John E. Coffee.

See also
List of United States Congress members who died in office (1790–1899)

References

External links
 
 History of Old Jacksonville, Georgia

Georgia (U.S. state) Democrats
1782 births
1836 deaths
People from Prince Edward County, Virginia
People of the Creek War
Coffee County, Georgia
Jacksonian members of the United States House of Representatives from Georgia (U.S. state)
People from Telfair County, Georgia
People from Hancock County, Georgia
American slave owners
19th-century American politicians